Thomas Whitehead may refer to:

 Thomas Whitehead (politician) (1825–1901), politician, lawyer, editor and merchant from Virginia
 Thomas Whitehead (businessman) (1787–1859), business man in Rawtenstall, Lancashire
Thomas Whitehead and Brothers
 Thomas Whitehead (cricketer) (1853–1937), English cricketer
 Thomas North Whitehead (1891–1969), English human relations theorist and researcher
 T. H. Whitehead (Thomas Henderson Whitehead, 1851–1933), Scottish banker in Hong Kong
 Tom Whitehead (rugby league), English rugby league player